Joseph Oosting (born 29 January 1972) is a Dutch football manager and former player, who is currently the manager of Eredivisie side, RKC Waalwijk.

Club career
He played professional football from 1988 to 2006 for BV Veendam and FC Emmen.

Personal life
His son Thijs Oosting is also a professional footballer now and represented Netherlands internationally on junior levels.

References

External links
  Profile

1972 births
Living people
Dutch footballers
Association football midfielders
FC Emmen players
SC Veendam players
Eerste Divisie players
Dutch football managers
WKE managers
Footballers from Emmen, Netherlands
SBV Vitesse non-playing staff
Asser Christelijke Voetbalvereniging managers